Behind the Wall of Sleep is an EP by American extreme metal band Macabre released in 1994 on Nuclear Blast Records. It contains three new tracks and one cover of Black Sabbath's song "Behind the Wall of Sleep" from their 1970 debut album Black Sabbath.

This EP is included on the re-release of the Sinister Slaughter album; however the title is misspelled as Behind the Walls of Sleep.

The name comes from "Beyond the Wall of Sleep", a horror tale  written by H. P. Lovecraft.

Track listing
 "Fishtales" – 1:48 - Albert Fish
 "Behind the Wall of Sleep" – 3:52
 "Slaughter Thy Poser" – 2:14
 "Freeze Dried Man" – 3:59 - Jeffrey Dahmer

Credits 
 Corporate Death – guitars, vocals
 Nefarious – bass, vocals
 Dennis the Menace – drums
 Gouger (John Tolczyk) – engineer

Macabre (band) albums
1994 EPs
Nuclear Blast EPs